Alexandros Terzian (born Alejandro Terzián on 24 June 1968 in Buenos Aires) is a retired Argentine-Greek sprinter.

Terzián, competing for Argentina, won the national title of that country in 100 metres in 1989 and in both 100 and 200 metres in 1990. He then moved to Greece, taking his first national titles there in 1993.

The same year, Terzián won the 100 m at the 1993 Mediterranean Games, in what would be his career best time of 10.20 seconds. He also won the silver medal in 200 m at the same Games. He also competed at the World Indoor Championships and the World Championships without reaching the final.

In 1994, Terzián won the silver medal in 60 metres at the European Indoor Championships in a national Greek indoor record of 6.51 seconds, and finished seventh at the outdoor European Championships with 10.42.

His personal best time in 200 metres was 20.61 seconds, achieved in May 1997 in Piraeus. This places him ninth on the Greek all-time performers list of 200 metres.

Competition record

References

External links

1968 births
Living people
Greek male sprinters
Athletes (track and field) at the 1996 Summer Olympics
Olympic athletes of Greece
Athletes from Buenos Aires
Greek people of Argentine descent
Sportspeople of Argentine descent
Argentine emigrants to Greece
Mediterranean Games gold medalists for Greece
Mediterranean Games silver medalists for Greece
Athletes (track and field) at the 1993 Mediterranean Games
Mediterranean Games medalists in athletics